Roof of the World is a metaphoric description of the high region in the world, also known as High Asia. 

Roof of the World may also refer to:

The Roof of the World, a Doctor Who audio drama 
"The Roof of the World", first episode of the 1964 Doctor Who serial Marco Polo

See also
 Top of the World (disambiguation)
 Mount Imeon, an ancient name for the Central Asian complex of mountain ranges comprising the present Hindu Kush, Pamir and Tian Shan